This is a list of winners and nominees of the Primetime Emmy Award for Outstanding Lead Actor in a Drama Series. Beginning with the 18th Primetime Emmy Awards, leading actors in drama have competed alone. However, these dramatic performances included actors from miniseries, telefilms, and guest performers competing against main cast competitors. Such instances are marked below:

 # – Indicates a performance in a Miniseries or Television film, before the category's creation
 § – Indicates a performance as a guest performer, before the category's creation

Winners and nominations

1950s

1960s

1970s

1980s

1990s

2000s

2010s

2020s

Programs with multiple wins

4 wins
 Breaking Bad (3 consecutive)
 NYPD Blue (2 consecutive)

3 wins
 Columbo
 I Spy (consecutive)
 The Sopranos (2 consecutive)
 St. Elsewhere (2 consecutive)

2 wins
 Boston Legal
 The Defenders
 Father Knows Best (consecutive)
 Hill Street Blues (consecutive)
 Lou Grant
 Perry Mason

Programs with multiple nominations

14 nominations
 NYPD Blue

10 nominations
 St. Elsewhere

8 nominations
 Columbo
 Law & Order
 Mad Men
 This Is Us

7 nominations
 The West Wing

6 nominations
 24
 Breaking Bad
 ER
 House
 I Spy
 The Sopranos

5 nominations
 Better Call Saul
 Dexter
 The Equalizer
 Hill Street Blues
 House of Cards
 Ironside
 Lou Grant
 Magnum, P.I.
 Quantum Leap
 The Rockford Files

4 nominations
 L.A. Law
 Mannix
 Mission: Impossible
 Ozark
 Quincy, M.E.
 Six Feet Under
 The Streets of San Francisco
 Succession

3 nominations
 The Americans
 Boston Legal
 Dallas
 The Danny Thomas Show
 Dynasty
 Father Knows Best
 The Fugitive
 Gunsmoke
 The Jackie Gleason Show
 Marcus Welby, M.D.
 The Newsroom
 Perry Mason
 Pose
 Ray Donovan
 The Waltons
 Westworld

2 nominations
 Baretta
 Beauty and the Beast
 Bloodline
 Boardwalk Empire
 The Bob Cummings Show
 Cannon
 The Defenders
 The Dick Van Dyke Show
 Downton Abbey
 Dragnet
 Four Star Playhouse
 Friday Night Lights
 Have Gun – Will Travel
 Hennesey
 Homeland
 Homicide: Life on the Street
 I'll Fly Away
 In Treatment
 Kojak
 Moonlighting
 Naked City
 Northern Exposure
 The Phil Silvers Show
 Picket Fences
 The Practice
 Rescue Me
 Run for Your Life
 The Shield
 True Detective
 Twin Peaks
 The Untouchables
 The X-Files

Performers with multiple wins

4 wins
 Bryan Cranston (3 consecutive)
 Dennis Franz (2 consecutive)

3 wins
 Bill Cosby (consecutive)
 Peter Falk
 James Gandolfini (2 consecutive)
 James Spader (2 consecutive)
 Robert Young (2 consecutive)

2 wins
 Ed Asner
 Raymond Burr
 William Daniels (consecutive)
 E. G. Marshall (consecutive)
 Daniel J. Travanti (consecutive)

Performers with multiple nominations

8 nominations
 Raymond Burr*
 Peter Falk*
 Dennis Franz*
 Jon Hamm*

7 nominations
 James Garner*

6 nominations
 Bryan Cranston*
 James Gandolfini*
 Michael C. Hall
 Hugh Laurie 
 Martin Sheen 
 Kiefer Sutherland*
 Robert Young*

5 nominations
 Ed Asner*
 Sterling K. Brown*
 William Daniels*
 Ed Flanders*
 Bob Odenkirk
 Tom Selleck*
 Jimmy Smits
 Kevin Spacey
 Daniel J. Travanti*
 Sam Waterston
 Edward Woodward

4 nominations
 Scott Bakula
 Jason Bateman
 Richard Boone
 Kyle Chandler*
 Mike Connors
 Anthony Edwards
 Jack Klugman
 Karl Malden
 Michael Moriarty
 Matthew Rhys*
 James Spader*

3 nominations
 James Arness
 Andre Braugher*
 Bill Cosby*
 Robert Culp
 Jeff Daniels*
 John Forsythe
 David Janssen
 Peter Krause
 Martin Landau
 Billy Porter*
 Liev Schreiber
 Milo Ventimiglia

2 nominations
 Corbin Bernsen
 Robert Blake*
 Hugh Bonneville
 Paul Burke
 Steve Buscemi
 Gabriel Byrne
 Michael Chiklis*
 George Clooney
 William Conrad
 Jackie Cooper
 Brian Cox
 David Duchovny
 Ben Gazzara
 Larry Hagman
 Denis Leary
 Damian Lewis*
 Kyle MacLachlan
 E. G. Marshall*
 Rob Morrow
 Ron Perlman
 Telly Savalas*
 Tom Skerritt*
 Robert Stack*
 Jeremy Strong*
 Richard Thomas*
 Michael Tucker
 Jack Webb
 Bruce Willis*

(*) refers to those who have won in this category

Superlatives

See also
 Primetime Emmy Award for Outstanding Lead Actor in a Comedy Series
 Primetime Emmy Award for Outstanding Lead Actress in a Drama Series
 Golden Globe Award for Best Actor – Television Series Drama
 Screen Actors Guild Award for Outstanding Performance by a Male Actor in a Drama Series

Notes

References

Lead Actor - Drama Series
 
Emmy Award